Hatice Sultan ("respecful lady";  1660 – 5 July 1743) was an Ottoman princess, the daughter of Mehmed IV, and his Haseki Emetullah Rabia Gülnuş Sultan. She was the sister of Sultans Mustafa II and Ahmed III.

Early life
Hatice Sultan was born in 1660 to Mehmed IV and his favorite Haseki Emetullah Rabia Gülnuş Sultan. She was the eldest child and the first daughter of her parents. She was the older sister of Sultans Mustafa II and Ahmed III and princesses Ayşe Sultan, Fatma Emetullah Sultan and Ümmügülsüm Sultan.

Marriages
Hatice Sultan married in 1675 to Kuloğlu Musahip Mustafa Pasha, who was the Admiral of the Fleet. She had fifteen years. Years earlier, Musahip had been offered Bican Sultan, one of Ibrahim I's daughters as wife, but he refused her. The engagement took place on 21 June 1675. On 30 June 1675, the wedding took place and on the same day her brothers Mustafa and Ahmed were circumcised. A complete 20-day wedding celebration took place in Edirne on the account of her wedding. The dowry that Mehmed gave for her wedding was amazed by the travellers in Edirne at the time.  The dowry of Hatice Sultan was carried by eighty-six mules, and the mules were covered with robe fabrics. There were also many carpets, rugs, beds and table cloths.  Apart from decorated porcelain candle holders and gold candlesticks, pearl boots, shoes, slippers and horseshoes, bracelets decorated with precious stones, choker necklaces, earrings, small size binoculars decorated with jewels, stools covered with pearls and jewellery were the most eye-catching dowry. In addition to these, seven chests of sugar chests, eight sugar proxies and two garden models made of sugar were placed in the procession. The wedding held in Edirne, theater-like entertainment was organized and banquets were held. The princess was transferred to her palace on 4 July 1675. The couple had five sons together.

After the death of Musahip Mustafa Pasha in October 1686, she was widowed by his death. Following the death of her husband, her sons were enrolled in the Enderun School by their grandfather Mehmed, however they died at a young age. Her father decided to marry her to Yeğen Osman Pasha, the marriage could only be held if Osman Pasha destroyed the thug in Anatolia. Unfortunately, the next year Mehmed was deposed from the throne and the marriage could not take place. 

In 1691, her uncle Suleiman II arranged  her marriage to his close-friend Moralı Hasan Pasha, he was the governor of Egypt. The wedding took place on 13 March 1691. They were given the Sinan Pasha Palace as their residence. They had a daughter. When her brother Mustafa became the sultan, he executed Grand Vizier Sürmeli Ali Pasha, and later appointed Elmas Mehmed Pasha as the grand vizier, Hatice gifted a sable fur coat to the new grand vizier.

Hasan Pasha was exiled to Izmit in 1704. Hatice Sultan decided to go with Hasan Pasha to Izmit. She asked her brother, the new Sultan Ahmed III for the permission to go with her husband. He approved her permission. She lived there for three years. In 1707, Hasan Pasha was pardoned and was sent to Egypt whereas Hatice returned to Istanbul, he was appointed as the governors of Egypt, Tripoli and Kütahya. After the death of Hasan Pasha in December 1713 in Şanlıurfa, she was widowed again by his death. She never married again.

Issue
By her first marriage, Hatice had five sons, all dead in infancy:
Sultanzade Mehmed Bey (1676 - ?)
Sultanzade Hasan Bey (1677 - 1684)
Sultanzade Çamur Vasif Bey (? -?)
Sultanzade Abbas Ali Bey (? - ?) 
Sultanzade Abdüllah Bey (? - ?)

By her second marriage Hatice had a daughter:
Ayşe Rukiye Hanımsultan (after 1691 - 1717)

Charities
Hatice Sultan had constructed primary school, fountains and mosques in Istanbul and Edirne. In 1711, she built a fountain in Istanbul, it had been set to built by Bekir Ağa.
 She also repaired the Yavedud Mosque, which was adjacent to coastal palace in 
Eyüp, she has added more land into the mosque and reconstructed it. Two of her freed slaves had been buried in that mosque.

Hatice Sultan appears to have been a dedicated collector of Oriental ware. Studies of the Topkapı Palace collections of Chinese porcelains and celadons. It has been suggested that the totals for this twenty-five year period and the decade following it were swollen by the incorporation of two massive collections. Her probate inventory turned out to comprise no fewer than sixty-two celadons, 2,303 Chinese porcelains, and twelve European porcelains, adding up to a total of 2,377 pieces.

When she married in 1675, she had only 311 porcelains and celadons in her trousseau. Hatice is known to have repeatedly fêted her brothers, Mustafa and Ahmed, in her palaces. On the eve of Patrona Halil rebellion in 1730, she was holding a banquet for the sultan and the grand vizier, as well as a crowd of high-ranking dignitaries, at her Üsküdar palace on the Bosphorus.

Death
Hatice Sultan died on 5 July 1743 at the age of eighty three in Edirne. Her body was brought back to Istanbul and was buried in the mausoleum of her grandmother at Turhan Sultan Türbe of The New Mosque at Eminönü in Istanbul. Hatice lived as a courtier during the reign of six sultans: her father Mehmed IV, her uncles Suleiman II and Ahmed II, her brothers Mustafa II and Ahmed III and nephew Mahmud I.

In popular culture
In the 2012 Turkish historical television series Bir Zamanlar Osmanlı: Kıyam, Hatice Sultan is portrayed by Turkish actress Türkan Şoray.

See also
 List of Ottoman princesses

Ancestry

References

Sources
 
 
 

1668 births
1743 deaths
Royalty from Istanbul
17th-century Ottoman princesses
18th-century Ottoman princesses